Rodinei Ricardo Martins (born 26 February 1969) is a retired Brazilian football player.

External links 
Rodinei Martins at playmakerstats.com (English version of ceroacero.es)

1969 births
Brazilian expatriate footballers
Brazilian footballers
C.D. Águila footballers
C.D. Atlético Marte footballers
C.D. Olimpia players
C.S. Herediano footballers
Expatriate footballers in Costa Rica
Expatriate footballers in El Salvador
Expatriate footballers in Honduras
L.D. Alajuelense footballers
Liga FPD players
Liga Nacional de Fútbol Profesional de Honduras players
Living people
Association football forwards